International Sun-Earth Explorer may refer to:
ISEE-1 (a.k.a. Explorer 56)
ISEE-2
ISEE-3 (later ICE)